Mihăieşti may refer to several villages in Romania:

 Mihăieşti, a village in Bistra Commune, Alba County
 Mihăieşti, a village in Sânpaul Commune, Cluj County
 Mihăieşti, a village in Dobra Commune, Hunedoara County
 Mihăieşti, a village in Horodniceni Commune, Suceava County

See also 
 Mihai (name)
 Mihăești (disambiguation)
 Mihăileni (disambiguation)
 Mihăilești